Maude  is a rural township near Geelong, Victoria, Australia  southwest of Melbourne in the Golden Plains Shire.

Maude Post Office opened on 1 August 1862 and closed in 1951.

References

Towns in Victoria (Australia)
Golden Plains Shire